Storgrovtinden is a mountain in Lom Municipality in Innlandet county, Norway. The mountain is surrounded by several other notable mountains including Galdhøi and Storgrovhøe to the northeast; Veslpiggen to the east; Galdhøpiggen, Keilhaus topp, and Storjuvtinden to the southeast; Skardstinden to the south; and Loftet to the southwest.

See also
List of mountains of Norway by height

References

Jotunheimen
Lom, Norway
Mountains of Innlandet